The Fourth Adenauer cabinet (German: Kabinett Adenauer IV) was formed by incumbent Chancellor Konrad Adenauer after the 1961 federal election. The cabinet was sworn in on 14 November 1961.

The Spiegel affair in 1962 caused the coalition to fall apart over Defence Minister Franz Josef Strauss' actions which violated press freedom, leading to all FDP ministers resigning in protest. As a result, the cabinet was a minority government of the CDU/CSU for just under a month in the fall of 1962 before Adenauer was able to convince the FDP to return to the coalition by assuring Strauß' resignation.

Composition 
Shortly after the Spiegel affair, the resignation of Defence Minister Franz Josef Strauss was required to gain back the FDP's support for the cabinet, leading to a reshuffle.  The heavily reshuffled cabinet is sometimes referred to as cabinet Adenauer V; however, this is not constitutionally correct, since no new election of the chancellor took place. The government still drew its constitutional legitimacy from Adenauer's election on 14 November 1961. Adenauer decided to retire just a few months later, following which Ludwig Erhard was elected as Chancellor and formed the first Erhard cabinet on 17 October 1963.

References and notes

Further reading
 

Coalition governments of Germany
Historic German cabinets
Cabinets established in 1961
Cabinets disestablished in 1962
1962 establishments in West Germany
1962 disestablishments in Germany
C4